Katrina Werry (born 10 October 1993) is an Australian national and world champion rower. At the 2017 World Rowing Championships, she became world champion in the women's coxless four with Lucy Stephan, Sarah Hawe, and Molly Goodman. She regained that coxless four world championship title in 2019. She won the Remenham Challenge Cup at the 2018 Henley Royal Regatta in the Australian women's eight. She rowed in the Australian women's eight at the Tokyo 2020 Olympics.

Club and state rowing
Raised in Victoria, Werry's senior rowing was from the Mercantile Rowing Club. She won a scholarship to the Victorian Institute of Sport.

Werry was first selected to represent Victoria in the women's youth eight in 2012 contesting the Bicentennial Cup at the Interstate Regatta within the Australian Rowing Championships. She raced again in 2013 in the Victorian youth eight. In 2015, 2017, 2018, 2021 and 2022 she was selected in Victoria's senior women's eight competing for the Queen's Cup at the Interstate Regatta. Those crews were victorious in all four years in which Werry raced.

In Mercantile colours she contested championship titles at the Australian Rowing Championships on numerous occasions. She raced in an all-Mercantile coxless pair and eight in the 2017 Australian Championships finishing in second place in both. She also contested the coxless pair title in 2018 finishing fourth. In 2021 in a National Training Centre eight she won the open women's eight title at the Australian Championships.

International representative rowing
Werry made her Australian representative debut in the women's eight competing at the 2014 World Rowing U23 Championships in Varese. They raced to fourth placing. The following year at the 2015 U23 World Championships in Plovdiv she raced a coxless pair with her Mercantile club-mate Addy Dunkly-Smith. They won the bronze medal

In 2017 Werry was elevated to the Australian senior squad and was selected in the coxless four with Lucy Stephan, Molly Goodman, and Sarah Hawe. They competed at the World Rowing Cups II & III and as a foursome they didn't lose a race in the international season. At the 2017 World Rowing Championships in Sarasota, Florida it was to be no different. They won their heat and started slow in the final sitting in sixth place at the 500m and fifth place at the 1000m mark. In third 500m they began to push on the Dutch and were joined by Poland & Russia all challenging for the podium. In the final sprint, Stephan called Goodman to up the rating and at 43 strokes per minute the Australian four surged into the lead to claim gold and the world championships title ahead of Poland & Russia.

Werry was selected in the Australian women's sweep squad in 2018 but was initially seated in the eight and replaced in the coxless four by Rosie Popa. In their second competitive outing of the 2018 international season in an Australian selection eight and racing as the Georgina Hope Rinehart National Training Centre, after Rowing Australia patron, Gina Rinehart, Werry won the 2018 Remenham Challenge Cup at the Henley Royal Regatta. Without Werry the four won gold at two WRCs in Europe but by the time of 2018 World Rowing Championships Popa was out of the four with an injury and Werry back in the two seat. Seated as they had been in 2017, the Australian four won their heat, were surprised by a new combination USA crew in the semi and then in the final placed second to the USA and finished with world championship silver.

In 2019 Werry was again picked in Australian women's sweep squad for the international season. For the two Rowing World Cups in Europe Werry was seated at two in the Australian coxless four and rowed to a bronze medal at RWC II in Poznan and to a gold medal at WRC III in Rotterdam. Werry, Aldersey, Hawe and Stephan were selected to race Australia's coxless four at the 2019 World Rowing Championships in Linz, Austria. The four were looking for a top eight finish at the 2019 World Championships to qualify for the Tokyo Olympics. They won their heat and semi-final, thereby qualifying the boat for Tokyo 2020. They led the final from start to finish, took the gold medal and regained their world champion title.  

In Tokyo the Australian women's eight placed third in their heat, fourth in the repechage and fifth in the Olympic A final.At the Tokyo 2020 Olympics the Australian women's eight were placed third in their heat, fourth in the repechage and fifth in the Olympic A final. Had they managed to maintain their time of 5:57:15 that they achieved in their repechage they would have beaten the winners, Canada, by nearly two seconds and won the gold medal.

In March 2022 Werry was selected in the women's sweep squad of the broader Australian training team to prepare for the 2022 international season and the 2022 World Rowing Championships.  She rowed in Australian women's coxless four at the World Rowing Cup II in Poznan to a gold medal victory.   At the 2022 World Rowing Championships at Racize, she rowed in the Australian coxless four to a bronze medal.

References

External links

1993 births
Living people
Australian female rowers
World Rowing Championships medalists for Australia
Rowers at the 2020 Summer Olympics
Olympic rowers of Australia
21st-century Australian women